"Please Return Your Love to Me" is a 1968 hit single by The Temptations for the Gordy (Motown) label. Produced by Norman Whitfield, who co-wrote the song with Barrett Strong and Barbara Neely, it is the last single to feature David Ruffin in the lineup (he is featured in the background). With Eddie Kendricks singing lead (his first as a solo lead vocalist since 1966's "Get Ready"), it peaked on the Billboard Hot 100 Pop charts in the Top 30 at number 26, and number 4 on the Billboard R&B Singles charts.  Billboard described the single as a "strong easy beat ballad loaded with sales appeal."  Cash Box said that it is "in a slow vein that carries new shades of power in the group’s familiar style" and is "backed by the solid Motown rhythm section."

The b-side, "How Can I Forget", is led by Paul Williams and was allegedly one of the earliest songs recorded by the group after Ruffin's departure. Though "How Can I Forget" was also covered by Marvin Gaye, the Temptations' original did not appear on any album or compilation until 1994's Emperors of Soul box set.

Personnel
 Lead vocals by Eddie Kendricks
 Background vocals by Melvin Franklin, Paul Williams, David Ruffin, and Otis Williams
 Written by  Norman Whitfield and Barrett Strong
Produced by Norman Whitfield
 Instrumentation by The Funk Brothers

Notes

1968 singles
The Temptations songs
Songs written by Barrett Strong
Songs written by Norman Whitfield
Song recordings produced by Norman Whitfield
Gordy Records singles
1968 songs